The Labatt Open was a golf event on the PGA Tour that was played in Canada from 1953 to 1957. It was sponsored by the Labatt Brewing Company, and played at several different venues. It was canceled after the 1957 season when suitable dates in 1958 could not be agreed.

Billy Casper won the first of his 51 PGA Tour wins at this event in 1956.

Tournament hosts
1953 Summerlea Golf & Country Club, Vaudreuil-Dorion, Quebec
1954 Scarboro Golf & Country Club, Scarborough, Ontario
1955 Summerlea Golf & Country Club, Vaudreuil-Dorion, Quebec
1956 Royal Quebec Golf Club, Boischatel, Quebec
1957 Islesmere Golf & Country Club, Sainte-Dorothée, Quebec

Winners

References

Former PGA Tour events
Golf tournaments in Ontario
Golf tournaments in Quebec